Portieux is a commune in the Vosges department in Grand Est in northeastern France.

Inhabitants are called Portessiens.

Geography

History
Formerly known by its Latin name, Portus Coelorum, the little town grew up around a priory founded in 1107 by Gérard of Vaudémont, which relocated to Nancy in 1616.

The town got a second chance at the start of the eighteenth century courtesy of the Dukes of Lorraine.   In 1705 Duke Leopold rewarded his faithful, courageous and devoted steward by granting him the right to establish a glass works on the edge of the forest at Portieux.   François Magnien amply justified his patron's generosity: the enterprise quickly grew and acquired fame across Europe.   It continues to flourish.

See also
Communes of the Vosges department

References
 Portieux glass works

Communes of Vosges (department)